Kantakaupunki is a ward of Jyväskylä, Finland. Over 25.000 people live in Kantakaupunki. Keskusta, Puistola, Harju, Lutakko, Mattilanpelto, Mäki-Matti, Kukkumäki, Nisula, Taulumäki, Tourula and Mannila are districts of Kantakaupunki.

Gallery

References

External links

Neighbourhoods of Jyväskylä